Michael Edward Sobel is an American statistician who is a professor in the Department of Statistics at Columbia University. He is known for developing the Sobel test, a statistical test that is used to detect the presence of mediation between two variables by a third variable.

References

External links
Faculty page

Living people
American statisticians
Florida State University alumni
University of Wisconsin–Madison alumni
Columbia University faculty
American sociologists
Members of the Sociological Research Association
Year of birth missing (living people)